The 3rd Australian Academy of Cinema and Television Arts Awards (generally known as AACTA Awards) are a series of awards which includes the 3rd AACTA Awards Luncheon, the 3rd AACTA Awards ceremony and the 3rd AACTA International Awards. The former two events were held at The Star Event Centre, in Sydney, New South Wales on 28 January and 30 January 2014, respectively. Presented by the Australian Academy of Cinema and Television Arts (AACTA), the awards celebrated the best in Australian feature film, television, documentary and short film productions of 2013. The AACTA Awards ceremony were televised on Network Ten. These awards were a continuum of the Australian Film Institute Awards (known as the AFI Awards), established in 1958 and presented until 2010, which was rebranded the AACTA Awards when the Australian Film Institute (AFI) established AACTA in 2011.

The Academy announced new television craft categories on 16 May 2013. However, a lack of funds and loss of a naming rights sponsor caused other categories to be either discontinued or merged with other awards. This included the merger of documentary craft categories into the new television craft prizes, which caused anger in the documentary making community. Due to the outcry, the Academy announced that it had received industry support and reinstated the documentary craft categories.

The nominees were announced during a press conference on 3 December 2013 in Sydney. The Great Gatsby (2013) received the most feature-film nominations with fourteen, earning a nomination in all categories, except for Best Original Screenplay. In television, Top of the Lake gained the most nominations with ten. Desert War and I Am A Girl earned four nominations each in the documentary field.

Background

Category restructuring
In December 2012, AACTA launched a campaign for additional awards. The aim was to include craft awards for television, which the Academy acknowledged was a big gap in the AACTA Awards categories. After consulting various industry guilds in the Australian screen industry, AACTA announced seven new craft categories in the television field for: Best Direction in a Light Entertainment or Reality Series, Best Editing, Best Cinematography, Best Sound, Best Original Music Score, Best Production Design and Best Costume Design. However, a lack of funds, due to the loss of Samsung as a naming rights sponsor in September 2012, lead to the restructuring of some accolades by the Academy for the 2014 awards. The Best Comedy Series and Best Light Entertainment Series were merged into a single Best Television Comedy or Light Entertainment Series. The award for Best Screenplay in a Short Film, Best Visual Effects and Best Young Actor was removed. Several of the documentary awards were also cancelled, including: Best Documentary Under One Hour, Best Documentary Series, Best Direction in a Documentary, Best Cinematography in a Documentary, Best Sound in a Documentary and Best Editing in a Documentary. The documentary craft awards would instead fall under the newly established television craft categories.

This caused anger in the Australian documentary making community, who found the changes to be "completely unacceptable". Representatives of Australian documentary group OzDox, condemned the process by which the category restructuring was made, saying that no one from the documentary sector was consulted during the industry guild consultation period. Australian actor Josh Lawson felt the merger of the Best Comedy Series and Light Entertainment Series categories is "insulting", and the general lack of comedy awards is a "slap in the face" for people working on comedic productions. Following the outcry by OzDox, AACTA announced it had received industry support and reinstated the four documentary craft awards, and split the television directing categories into Best Direction in a Drama or Comedy and Best Direction in a Television Light Entertainment or Reality Series.

Winners and nominees
The nominees were announced during a press conference on 3 December 2013 in Sydney. The nominations event was hosted by Rob Carlton and read by Rodger Corser and Gracie Otto. Of the nominees, The Great Gatsby (2013) received the most feature-film nominations with fourteen, including Best Film, Best Direction for Baz Luhrmann, Best Adapted Screenplay for Baz Luhrmann and Craig Pearce, Best Cinematography for Simon Duggan, Best Lead Actor for Leonardo DiCaprio, Best Lead Actress for Rose Byrne, Best Supporting Actor for Joel Edgerton, Best Supporting Actress for Elizabeth Debicki and Isla Fisher, and Best Original Music Score for Craig Armstrong. In television, Top of the Lake received the most nominations with ten. These include Best Telefeature or Mini Series, Best Direction in a Television Drama or Comedy, Best Cinematography in Television, Best Guest or Supporting Actor – Drama for Peter Mullan, and Best Guest or Supporting Actress – Drama for Robyn Nevin, and Best Original Music Score in Television.

Feature film

Television

Documentary

Short film

Productions with multiple nominations

Feature film

The following feature films received multiple nominations.

 Fourteen: The Great Gatsby (won 12)
 Twelve: The Rocket
 Seven: The Turning
 Six: Mystery Road
 Five: Dead Europe
 Four: Adoration
 Three: Drift and Goddess
 Two: 100 Bloody Acres and Satellite Boy

Television
The following television shows received multiple nominations.

 Ten: Top of the Lake (won 3)
 Eight: Mrs Biggs, Power Games: The Packer-Murdoch War (won 3),  and Redfern Now
 Six: An Accidental Soldier
 Four: Offspring
 Three: Please Like Me and Upper Middle Bogan
 Two: Australia's Got Talent, MasterChef Australia: The Professionals, Nowhere Boys, Peleda, Shaun Micallef's Mad as Hell, and Wentworth

See also
3rd AACTA International Awards

Notes

A: The Turning Ensemble consists of the seventeen people who directed their individual segments in the film. They are: Jonathan auf der Heide, Tony Ayres, Simon Stone, Jub Clerc, Robert Connolly, Shaun Gladwell, Rhys Graham, Justin Kurzel, Yaron Lifschitz, Anthony Lucas, Claire McCarthy, Ian Meadows, Ashlee Page, Stephen Page, Warwick Thornton, Marieka Walsh, Mia Wasikowska and David Wenham.

References

External links
 The Australian Academy of Cinema and Television Arts official website
 Official broadcast website at Network Ten

AACTA Awards ceremonies
AACTA Awards
AACTA Awards
AACTA Awards